Víctor Montilla (born May 26, 1970) is a Puerto Rican businessman, publishing senior executive, and broadcaster.

Career overview
Born on May 26, 1970, Víctor Montilla Torres received a BA in Communication Arts from Loyola University New Orleans. In 1992, he began working at Cordero Teleproducciones, serving as general producer for a range of productions before in 2005 becoming President of the Puerto Rico Corporation for Public Broadcasting (CPB).

In 2010, he joined Casiano Communications Inc.'s leadership team as Executive Vice President for one of the largest Hispanic Publisher of Magazine and Periodicals in the United States, with over 11 Publications, digital media, marketing services and a full telemarketing operation that serves Puerto Rico and the US Mainland.

In 2013 he returned to broadcasting as Executive Vice President and General Manager of New Channels for Telecinco Inc., the owner and operator of WORA TV, Channel 5 and ABC Television Network affiliate, ABC5 and VIVE TV Network.

After successfully leading development, operations and the launch of two tv networks in Puerto Rico, Montilla joined Florida-based Olympusat, a content and technology provider as Content and General Manager for Puerto Rico operations.  Since, he has taken the new role of President for Olympusat International, leading and developing operations of all businesses for Olympusat International including LATAM sales, content, channel and OTT platform distribution as well as co-production and strategic partnerships.

Awards 

 2006 Governor's Award from the Board of Governors of the Suncoast Chapter of the National Academy of Television Arts and Sciences. 
 2007 Television Executive of the Year by AdNotas.com.
 2015 Zenit Award, Communications Sector, Puerto Rico Chamber of Commerce
 2016 Top Management Award - Media, Puerto Rico Sales and Marketing Executive Association
 2017 Silver Circle Award, NATAS Suncoast Chapter

References

External links 
 Visual CV
 TUTV portal
 
 Caribbean Business
 Fundación Nacional para la Cultura Popular
 Diario Metro

1970 births
Loyola University New Orleans alumni
Living people
Puerto Rican businesspeople